Wang Aiping (born 18 March 1972) is a Chinese baseball coach who is known for coaching the China national baseball team in the 2008 Olympic Games and the 2009 World Baseball Classic. He has also coached for the Guangdong Leopards.

Early life
Wang Aiping was born 18 March 1972 in Lanzhou City, Gansu Province, China. From 1978 to 1986, he attended primary and secondary school, where he  learned to play baseball in Lanzhou City, Yuzhong County at Gansu Province. Wang became a member of a baseball team in Lanzhou City from 1987 to 1994.

In 1995, he became a member of a baseball team in Guangdong Province, with whom he played until 2001, when he became an assistant coach of the baseball team, a role he held until 2005. He was the coach of the Chinese National baseball team from 2006 to 2009. In March 2010, Aiping became the softball coach in Guangdong Province, a role he still holds.

Baseball career achievements

1997
 Third place on 8th National Games.

1998 - 2001
 Third place on National Championship.

2001
 Second place on 9th National Games.

2003
 First place on National Championship.

2005
 Fifth place on 10th National Games.

2008
 8th place on 2008 Beijing Olympic Games.

2009
 Participated in the Baseball World Series held in Japan.

Softball career achievements

2010
 2nd place on National Championship when he was appointed as a main coach. 1st place on National Championship.

2011
 3rd place on National Championship.

References

Living people
1972 births
Baseball coaches
Chinese baseball players